Abertura is a municipality in the province of Cáceres and autonomous community of Extremadura, Spain.

Geography
The municipal district is generally flat, with an altitude of between 380 and 430m, taking the Esparragosa as the highest point. The main rivers are the Búrdalo and Alcollarín rivers.

Demography
Abertura has had the following populations from 1900:

Specifically, during the 2000s, the population change was as follows:

History
In 1594 Cáceres formed part of the land of Trujillo in Trujillo Province. At the fall of the Ancien Régime it was part of the constitutional municipality in the region of Extremadura that, from 1834, became part of the Judicial District of Logrosán. According to an 1842 census, the area accounted for 200 households and 1096 residents.

Education 
In 2001, Abertura was the third municipality of more than 100 inhabitants in Cáceres province with a majority of the population without an education. In total, 66.2% of the population greater than 10 years old lacked any type of educational training. This percentage was well above the 23.9% regional average and the 15.3% state average.

Monuments
 San Juan Bautista Parish Church (15th century)
 Santa Ana Hermitage

See also
 List of municipalities in Cáceres

References

External links 
 Cáceres Turismo 

Municipalities in the Province of Cáceres
Articles which contain graphical timelines